Christelle Gros (born 19 May 1975) is a French biathlete. She competed in the two events at the 1998 Winter Olympics.

References

External links
 

1975 births
Living people
Biathletes at the 1998 Winter Olympics
French female biathletes
Olympic biathletes of France
Place of birth missing (living people)